Richard Lewis is a British esports journalist and livestream commentator from Wales. Having written technology articles for The Daily Dot, Breitbart News, and Cadred, he is best known as an esports journalist and as a former desk host of ELEAGUE.

Career

Journalism 

On January 16, 2015, Lewis released an article providing evidence of Counter-Strike match fixing scandal involving the North American team iBuyPower during a game held in August 2014. His report showed that the team had purposefully lost a game. Lewis reported on staff of betting website CSGOLounge showing suspicious patterns, testimony from people involved, and leaked conversations. Following the report, Valve, owners of the Counter Strike franchise issued an indefinite ban to the players from playing in official Valve sponsored tournaments. Valve has not expanded on the sentence, except confirming the ban was "indefinite". Because of this ban, the players would not be hired by teams, knowing they would not be part of the Major tournaments. Despite that, in July 2017, tournament and league organiser ESL announced they would not enforce the ban anymore letting the players compete in their own tournaments.

Another report shed light on corruption in the world in 2016.

Using CS:GO virtual items as currency, many websites appeared letting players bet on games, while other websites would let the player gamble using these items in various casino inspired games. Players would put items in their wallet which translated into currency, gamble, and winners would cash out their earning by obtaining more valuable items. These items are valued by their market price in the Steam Community Market.

In 2016, Lewis reported on CS:GO based skin gambling regarding YouTube personalities Tmartn and ProSyndicate alleging that they both had promoted a gambling website called CSGOLotto without disclosing their ownership of the operation. This constituted a violation of the Federal Trade Commission guidelines. In September 2017, the FTC settled the case against the two YouTubers, while providing new guidelines for social media influencers regarding paid promotion and transparency. They would also mention that they had taken interest in 20 other personalities that would have been involved in such practice on different platforms.

In July 2016 he released a YouTube video report about the website CSGOShuffle. The report would be based on the testimony of a hacker who admitted to having tried to hack the CSGOShuffle gambling website in order to steal money from the operation. In that attempt the hacker came across conversations between CSGOShuffle coder and owner and a popular Twitch streamer broadcasting his gambling on the website. The leaked logs show the streamer talking to website staff about obtaining odds and helping him cheat the house. They would also show the streamer exchanging payments to the coder and referring to the casino and staff as "us", implying ownership of the operation which he did not disclose.

This would put a lot of personalities and gambling platforms under scrutiny, following the Tmartn and ProSyndicate transparency issue, this new scandal would expose the ability of these platforms to not only mislead the audiences of influencers but also how they could possibly cheat their users to make more profit. This would force Valve to take action against these websites by issuing Cease and Desist letters, preventing them from using Valve intellectual properties such as virtual items designs, names, and using automated Steam accounts to transfer user's items from their accounts to the websites bank and back. Following videos of Richard Lewis would allege Phantoml0rd would run giveaways during his broadcasts in order to gain subscribers.

Lewis would also investigate and report on unethical practices in esports such as tournament organisers or teams not paying salaries or holding players under unfair contracts. He would often call for players to consult with him if they felt the need to so he could review contracts, provide advice, and help players or other personalities get paid by their employers. Lewis reported on the popular Swedish organisation Ninjas In Pyjamas when it came out they had not been paying their Counter Strike roster their due salary resulting in the CEO at the time resigning. While first denying the allegations of malpractice stating the report drew "incorrect conclusions [...] based on misinformation". The NiP organisation would announce shortly after that the CEO would step down and be replaced immediately.

Earlier in his career his most notable report was about a cheating program. In 2009 Richard Lewis would leak a program to the public. The program, a small executable file called vent.exe was a cheat, disguised as being part of a popular VOiP software called Ventrilo. Similar to today's Discord or Teamspeak, it was widely used in the gaming world by teams to communicate during games. The cheat program would be small enough to be carried on a flash drive or even in a mouse or keyboard's onboard memory. It was a basic type of aimbot cheat, that would correct the player's aim may he be slightly off target. In such a subtle manner that it was almost invisible to the eye test, and would almost never fail and expose the cheater. This was one of the first cheat that would be usable in a LAN setting, where the player is exposed to the public eye. As it was disguised as a common program used by participants, it was possible to run the cheat without attracting suspicion, even on the computer provided by the tournament.

In 2016 Lewis was awarded the "Esports Journalist of the Year" award by Esports Industry Awards. In 2019, Lewis won the award a second time. In his 2019 acceptance speech, Lewis criticized gaming outlets such as Kotaku and Polygon for gatekeeping the games industry.

In September 2020, Lewis became the first editor-at-large of Dexerto.

Broadcasting 
In May 2015, Lewis released the first episode of "By The Numbers: CSGO", a weekly Counter-Strike: Global Offensive podcast which he co-hosted with fellow Counter-Strike analyst, Duncan "Thorin" Shields. The podcast was sponsored by the fantasy esports service Alphadraft. After forty episodes, the show's final episode aired in April 2016. In August 2017, Richard Lewis published the first episode of "Return Of By The Numbers," a reboot of the original By The Numbers podcast. Shields returned as co-host. The show was funded via Patreon donations and later by the sports betting company, Rivalry.gg. As of May 2021, there have been over 190 episodes of the show broadcast live on Twitch and later uploaded to YouTube.

In late 2015, it was reported that broadcasting conglomerate Turner would be launching a Counter-Strike: Global Offensive professional league, called ELEAGUE, which would be aired weekly on the American television channel TBS. Lewis was invited to be a host for the league. In April 2018, Lewis announced that after two years with ELEAGUE he would be leaving as the full-time host to pursue other opportunities.

In July 2018, ESP Gaming announced that Richard Lewis would serve as Director of Talent and oversee the on-air personalities for a new multi-genre esports tournament series called the "World Showdown of Esports (WSOE)."

Lewis discusses current events in a podcast called The Richard Lewis Show, co-hosted by Sam Davies. Over three hundred episodes have been produced since May 2016.

Controversy 
In November 2015 at DreamHack Winter 2015, police were called following a physical altercation between Lewis and Alliance Dota 2 player Jonathan 'Loda' Berg. On Twitter, Berg claimed he was strangled by Lewis, and Lewis responded saying he acted defensively when confronted by Berg who should not have been allowed backstage. Lewis told PC Gamer he apologized to Berg and that the police found it reasonable he felt threatened by Berg's actions. Police confirmed an assault was reported but no charges were filed. DreamHack responded saying that Berg "aggressively approached" Lewis, and while the two were yelling at each other, Lewis was the first to initiate physical contact by grabbing Berg's neck when he felt threatened. DreamHack intended to ask both Berg and Lewis to leave, but after apologizing to each other they were allowed to stay, however, DreamHack announced they would no longer work with Richard Lewis. "We cannot condone violent behavior at our events."

In 2015, Lewis's Reddit account was banned from commenting or posting on the League of Legends subreddit due to "sustained abusive behavior" after several warnings and a temporary ban. Shortly after, Lewis wrote several articles questioning the relationship between the moderators of the subreddit and the game's developer Riot Games, revealing that subreddit moderators were asked to sign non-disclosure agreements with the developer and that several former moderators were later hired by the company. A month later, a moderator for the subreddit announced that his content would be banned from the site after users on the subreddit critical of Lewis were allegedly harassed upon Lewis posting their comments on Twitter. "His YouTube channel, his articles, his Twitch, and his Twitter are no longer welcome in this subreddit. We will also not allow any rehosted content from this individual." In an interview with Kotaku, Lewis defended himself by disputing the initial allegations of abusive behavior, and argued that he had never asked his followers on Twitter to harass Reddit users. "The mods are doing this to try and get me fired [from The Daily Dot]." In his Facebook post announcing his resignation from The Daily Dot several months later, Lewis cited the content ban among his reasons for leaving, saying "...it had a huge impact on my work and working environment. Important stories pertaining to League of Legends that I have written have gone unnoticed..."

References

External links

Esports commentators
Living people
Place of birth missing (living people)
Year of birth missing (living people)
Twitch (service) streamers
Esports journalists